Sven Barth (born 30 December 1980 in Weinheim, Baden-Württemberg) is a German racing driver. He has competed in such series as Formula Renault V6 Eurocup and Formula Renault 3.5 Series.

References

External links
 Career statistics from Driver Database

1980 births
Living people
People from Weinheim
Sportspeople from Karlsruhe (region)
Racing drivers from Baden-Württemberg
German racing drivers
German Formula Three Championship drivers
Formula Renault V6 Eurocup drivers
World Series Formula V8 3.5 drivers
ADAC GT Masters drivers

24H Series drivers